Çatalçam, historically and still informally called Şibib, is a village in the Oğuzeli District, Gaziantep Province, Turkey. The village is inhabited by Turkmens of the Barak and Bozgeyikli tribes.

References

Villages in Oğuzeli District